Chinatown Station may refer to transit stations in:

United States
 Chinatown station (MBTA), a subway station in Boston, Massachusetts
 Cermak–Chinatown station, an "L" station in Chicago, Illinois
 Chinatown station (HART), a planned light rail station in Honolulu, Hawaii
 Chinatown station (Los Angeles Metro), a light rail station in Los Angeles, California
 Canal Street (New York City Subway), a subway station that had Chinese characters meaning “Chinatown”.  The characters have been removed when the historical tiles were restored.
 Chinatown station (SEPTA), a subway station in Philadelphia, Pennsylvania
 Old Town/Chinatown station, a light rail station in Portland, Oregon
 Chinatown station (Muni Metro), a subway station under construction in San Francisco, California
 International District/Chinatown station, a light rail station in Seattle, Washington
 Chinatown station, now Gallery Place station, a metro station near Chinatown in Washington, DC

Worldwide
 Chinatown MRT station, a Mass Rapid Transit station in Singapore
 Stadium–Chinatown station, a Skytrain station in Vancouver, Canada
 Rose China Town light rail station, a light rail station in New Taipei, Taiwan